Roy Lester Schneider (May 13, 1939 - December 18, 2022) was a Virgin Islander politician and physician who served as the fifth elected Governor of the United States Virgin Islands from January 5, 1995 to January 4, 1999.

Biography
Schneider was born on the island of Saint Thomas in 1939. He attended Howard University, earning a bachelor's degree in 1961 and a medical degree in 1965. He served in the U.S. Army from 1966 to 1968 during the Vietnam War. In Vietnam, he was a medical advisor and surgeon from 1967 to 1968. The United States awarded him a Bronze Star for his service, while the Republic of Vietnam awarded him the Vietnamese Honor Medal First Class and the Technical Service Honor Medal. He became a captain.

After returning to civilian life, Schneider became a physician in his native Virgin Islands. He served as the U.S. Virgin Islands' Commissioner of Health from 1977 to 1987. In 1994, he was elected to the governorship. In 1999, he was defeated for re-election by Democrat Charles Wesley Turnbull. He is considered by the National Governors Association to have been a Republican.

Schneider is the namesake of the Roy Lester Schneider Hospital on Saint Thomas.

Post-gubernatorial career
In February 2000, Schneider and three cabinet members which includes executive assistant Maureen Bryan, OMB director Alvin Battiste and Finance Commissioner Dean Wallace were charged with conspiracy, embezzlement and fraud when the four of them allegedly conspired to pay a $29,000 bill at Marriott Frenchman's Reef Hotel for a room occupied by Walter Brunner, a close friend to Schneider and who was on contract with the Virgin Islands government after Hurricane Marilyn. In March 2000, Territorial Court Judge Ive A. Swan dismissed all charges against Schneider and his three associates and instead set a date for trial on charges of conspiracy, fraud and falsification of records. Schneider pleaded not guilty.

Schneider died on December 18, 2022 at the age of 83.

References

External links
National Governors Association Biography

1939 births
Living people
Governors of the United States Virgin Islands
Howard University alumni
People from Saint Thomas, U.S. Virgin Islands
Republican Party governors of the United States Virgin Islands
United States Army Medical Corps officers
United States Army personnel of the Vietnam War
United States Virgin Islands military doctors